Anophthalmus hitleri is a species of blind cave beetle found only in about fifteen humid caves in Slovenia. The blind cave beetle shares its genus with 41 other species and 95 different subspecies. Members of its subfamily (Trechinae) are, like most Carabidae, predatory, so the adults and larvae of A. hitleri are presumed to be predators on smaller cave inhabitants.

Name 
The scientific name of the beetle comes from an Austrian collector, Oskar Scheibel, who was sold a specimen of a then undocumented species in 1933. Its species name was made a dedication to Adolf Hitler, who had recently become Chancellor of Germany. The genus name means eyeless, so the full name can be translated as "the eyeless one of Hitler". The dedication did not go unnoticed by the Führer, who sent Scheibel a letter showing his gratitude.

The species exhibits no notable characteristics, such as extravagant colors or unusual antennae, and is of interest to beetle collectors (and also collectors of Hitler memorabilia) as a result of its name. This is putting the beetle in danger of extinction.

While many have suggested the species be renamed, the International Code of Zoological Nomenclature's principle of priority holds that the first name validly given to a species is its correct name and does not in general allow for a name to be invalidated due to causing offense. On the topic of A. hitleri's name, International Commission on Zoological Nomenclature (ICZN) President Thomas Pape says: "It was not offensive when it was proposed, and it may not be offensive 100 years from now." One potential solution suggested by the vice-president of the ICZN, Patrice Bouchard, is to "informally change the vernacular name."

See also 
 List of organisms named after famous people (born 1800–1899)

References 

Adolf Hitler
Trechinae
Cave beetles
Beetles described in 1937
Beetles of Europe
Endemic fauna of Slovenia
Naming controversies